Luton North is a constituency represented in the House of Commons of the UK Parliament since 2019 by Sarah Owen, of the Labour Party. 

Luton North was created in 1983, primarily from the former seat of Luton West. It consists of the northern portion of the town of Luton, excluding Stopsley.

Constituency profile 
One constituency other than Luton North includes Luton; Luton South. Both cover a similar housing profile and economic ambit that have seen house prices increase above the national average since 1997, two periods of relatively high numbers of the unemployed and lowest wage earners (the 1990s and 2008–2011 global recession). The former covers roughly the LU3 and 4 postcode districts and excludes the town centre of what one broadsheet characterised as a tough town whereas other commentators state that Luton has a resilient economy which "revolves around the airport as well as the retail sector."

At creation, Luton North included eight wards from the neighbouring districts of Mid Bedfordshire and South Bedfordshire; these made it a much safer seat for the Conservatives than Luton South, which included only one ward from outside the Borough of Luton. Boundary changes in 1997 reduced the Conservative majority from 13,094 to 7,357, and it was 81st on Labour's list of target seats; Labour duly gained it on a 17.1% swing, and since then the Labour MP elected in 1997, Kelvin Hopkins, had held the seat with comfortable majorities.

From  2005 to 2015, Luton North was Labour's safest seat in the East of England by both vote and vote share majority; in  2017 it was overtaken in the former count by  Norwich South, but the percentage margin in Luton North (30.8% compared to 30.4% in Norwich South) is slightly higher.

Boundaries and boundary changes

1983–1997: The Borough of Luton wards of Bramingham, Challney, Icknield, Leagrave, Lewsey, Limbury, and Sundon Park, the District of Mid Bedfordshire wards of Flitton and Pulloxhill, Flitwick East, Flitwick West, Harlington, and Westoning, and the District of South Bedfordshire wards of Barton-le-Clay, Streatley, and Toddington.

Created as a County Constituency formally known as North Luton, incorporating the bulk of the abolished Borough Constituency of Luton West.  Extended northwards to include part of the abolished County Constituency of South Bedfordshire as well as Flitwick, transferred from Mid Bedfordshire.

1997–2010: The Borough of Luton wards of Bramingham, Challney, Icknield, Leagrave, Lewsey, Limbury, Saints, and Sundon Park.

Redesignated as the Borough Constituency of Luton North.  The Saints ward of the Borough of Luton transferred from Luton South.  The parts of the Districts of Mid Bedfordshire (including Flitwick) and South Bedfordshire transferred to the County Constituency of Mid Bedfordshire.

2010–present: The Borough of Luton wards of Barnfield, Bramingham, Challney, Icknield, Leagrave, Lewsey, Limbury, Northwell, Saints, and Sundon Park.

Marginal loss changes due to revision of local authority wards.

Members of Parliament

Elections

Elections in the 2010s

Elections in the 2000s

Elections in the 1990s

Elections in the 1980s

See also
List of parliamentary constituencies in Bedfordshire
Politics in Luton

Notes

References

Politics of Luton
Parliamentary constituencies in Bedfordshire
Constituencies of the Parliament of the United Kingdom established in 1983